Marston Magna railway station served the village of Marston Magna, Somerset, England from 1856 to 1966 on Heart of Wessex Line.

History 
The station opened as Marston on 1 September 1856 by the Great Western Railway. Its name was changed to Marston Magna on 9 May 1895. It closed to both passengers and goods traffic on 3 October 1966.

References

External links 

Disused railway stations in Somerset
Former Great Western Railway stations
Railway stations in Great Britain opened in 1856
Railway stations in Great Britain closed in 1966
1856 establishments in England
1966 disestablishments in England
Beeching closures in England